{{DISPLAYTITLE:C12H16O}}
The molecular formula C12H16O (molar mass: 176.26 g/mol, exact mass: 176.1201 u) may refer to:

 trans-2-Phenyl-1-cyclohexanol